Baccharis dracunculifolia is a medical plant found in Brazil, Bolivia, Argentina, and Uruguay.

Baccharis dracunculifolia is used for green propolis production.

References

dracunculifolia
Plants described in 1836
Flora of South America
Medicinal plants of South America